Tetrops warnckei is a species of beetle in the family Cerambycidae. It was described by Holzschuh in 1977. It is known from Turkey.

References

Tetropini
Beetles described in 1977